Dulce River may refer to:

 Dulce River (Guatemala)
 Dulce River (Argentina)

Other 
 Cricovul Dulce River
 Izvorul Dulce River

See also 
 Dulce (disambiguation)